Morton Isaac Abramowitz (born January 20, 1933) is an American diplomat and former U.S. State Department official. Starting his overseas career in Taipei, Taiwan after joining the foreign service, he served as U.S. Ambassador to Thailand and Turkey and as the Assistant Secretary of State for Intelligence and Research. He retired from the State Department with the rank of Career Ambassador. He then became president of the Carnegie Endowment for International Peace and founded the International Crisis Group.

Abramowitz currently serves as co-chair for the Bipartisan Policy Center's Turkey Initiative.

Early life
Morton Abramowitz was born in Lakewood Township, New Jersey, on January 20, 1933, the son of Mendel and Dora (Smith) Abramowitz.  He received his B.A. from Stanford University (in history and economics) in 1953.  He then attended Harvard University, earning an M.A. in 1955.

He also served in the U.S. Army and U.S. Army Reserves from 1958 to 1961.

In 1956, Abramowitz joined the United States Department of Labor as a management intern and, then, as a labor economist from 1957–58, while waiting for an appointment at the Department of State.

Career in the Foreign Service
In 1959, he joined the United States Department of State. His first two assignments were as a consular-economic officer in Taipei (1960-1962) and an economic officer in Hong Kong (1963-1966). He was known as Ai Mo-huei, his Mandarin name during his tour in Taiwan.

He returned to Washington in 1966, spending the next seven years there in various capacities, including serving as special assistant to Under Secretary Elliot Richardson.

From 1973 to 1978, he was political adviser to the Commander-in-Chief of the Pacific Command (1973-1974) and then deputy assistant secretary of Defense for international affairs (1974-1978).

In 1978, President of the United States Jimmy Carter named Abramowitz United States Ambassador to Thailand, and he held this post from August 9, 1978 until July 31, 1981.

In 1983, President Ronald Reagan named Abramowitz as the U.S. representative to the Mutual and Balanced Force Reduction Negotiations in Vienna, with ambassadorial rank.

In 1985, President Reagan nominated Abramowitz as Director of the Bureau of Intelligence and Research, and Abramowitz held this office from February 1, 1985 through May 19, 1989 (with the name of the office changing to Assistant Secretary of State for Intelligence and Research in 1986).

In 1989, President George H. W. Bush named Abramowitz United States Ambassador to Turkey, a post he held until 1991.

In 1990, he was awarded the rank of Career Ambassador.

Post Government career
Abramowitz retired from government service in 1991 and took over as president of the Carnegie Endowment for International Peace. He was elected a Fellow of the American Academy of Arts and Sciences in 1995. He retired from that position in 1997. Since then, he has been a Senior Fellow of The Century Foundation and a director of the National Endowment for Democracy.

He is a long-time board member of the International Rescue Committee.

Abramowitz played a leading role in the foundation of the International Crisis Group, and has been a board member since its inception in 1995.

Abramowitz served for nine years on the board of the National Endowment for Democracy, and on retirement in 2007 was awarded its Democracy Service Medal.

Family
Abramowitz is married to Sheppie Glass Abramowitz, the sister of composer Philip Glass. Sheppie Abramowitz spent her career advocating on behalf of refugees and asylum seekers for the International Rescue Committee and KIND (Kids in Need of Defense). 
The couple have two adult children. Michael Abramowitz, the president of Freedom House, is a former reporter and editor at the Washington Post and headed the Committee on Conscience of the U.S. Holocaust Memorial Museum.
He is married to Susan Baer, a former reporter at the Baltimore Sun. Daughter Rachel Abramowitz had a successful career as an entertainment reporter for the Los Angeles Times before embarking on a second career writing scripts for cable television pilots with her husband, screenwriter (Wonderful World) and director Joshua Goldin.

Awards
 Lifetime Contributions to American Diplomacy (2006), awarded by the American Foreign Service Association
 Democracy Service Medal (2007), awarded by the National Endowment for Democracy
 Joseph C. Wilson Award for International Service from the University of Rochester
 Career Ambassador (1990)
 National Intelligence Medal (1989)
 President's Award for Distinguished Federal Civilian Service (1981, 1985, 1988)
in 1980, and the President’s Award for Distinguished Federal Service in 1981, 1985, and 1988. He also was awarded the National Intelligence Medal in 1989, the Director General’s Cup of the Foreign Service in 1995, and the Award for Lifetime Contributions to American Diplomacy of the American Foreign Service Association.

Writing
 Americans Are Ignoring Syria's Humanitarian Crisis, Washington Post, December 5, 2013 
 With Richard Harris Moorsteen,  
 Moving the Glacier: The Two Koreas and the Powers International Institute for Strategic Studies, 1971
 East Asian Actors and Issues (1991)
 China: Can We Have A Policy? Carnegie Endowment for International Peace, 1997,  
 ed. Turkey's Transformation and American Policy, Century Foundation Press, 2000,  
 with James T. Laney,  
 ed. The United States and Turkey: allies in need, Century Foundation Press, 2003,  
 with Stephen W. Bosworth, Chasing the Sun: Rethinking East Asian Policy Since 1992 Century Foundation, 2006,

References

External links
 
 Foreign Service Journal article on his Lifetime Contributions to American Diplomacy Award. 
  
 from History Commons
 Profile from the Century Foundation

1933 births
United States Assistant Secretaries of State
Living people
Stanford University School of Humanities and Sciences alumni
Harvard University alumni
20th-century American Jews
United States Department of Labor officials
Ambassadors of the United States to Thailand
Ambassadors of the United States to Turkey
United States Career Ambassadors
People from Lakewood Township, New Jersey
Fellows of the American Academy of Arts and Sciences
Assistant Secretaries of State for Intelligence and Research
Carnegie Endowment for International Peace
Recipients of the President's Award for Distinguished Federal Civilian Service
21st-century American Jews
20th-century American diplomats